Eupithecia yubitzae is a moth in the family Geometridae. It is found in the valleys of northern Chile: the Azapa, Chaca and Camarones valleys.

The larvae feed on Acacia macracantha and Prosopis tamarugo.

Etymology
The species is named in honor of Sra. Yubitza J. Cortés Jorquera.

References

Moths described in 2004
yubitzae
Moths of South America
Endemic fauna of Chile